Dr. Von D. Mizell-Eula Johnson State Park is a Florida State Park located in Dania Beach, Florida off Florida State Road A1A. The park is named for late civil rights activists Von Mizell and Eula Johnson, who first pressured Broward County (for years) to have at least one beach for African Americans, then led wade-ins in Ft. Lauderdale in 1961 that led to desegregation of the county's beaches the following year. The park's former namesake, John U. Lloyd, served as Broward County Attorney for over 30 years and was instrumental in obtaining the land for the park.

History
The park, opened in 1953, was originally the first beach open to African Americans in Broward County, and was first called simply "the Colored Beach". According to its official web page, "it was once the county's designated 'colored beach'". That it came into existence was due to 7 years of effort by Dr. Mizell and others. "The next challenge was getting the County to approve the construction of an access road leading to the beach, which still lacked any restrooms or shelter." Access was only by boat. A road was built in 1965. Thanks to the efforts of Mizell and Johnson, Broward County Beaches were desegregated in 1962.

Activities and amenities

Activities include fishing, surf casting, canoeing, and kayaking, as well as  swimming, boating, picnicking, and wildlife viewing. Amenities include a beach, two boat ramps, an education center, picnic tables, grills, and seven covered picnic pavilions. Visitors can rent canoes, kayaks, pavilions, and volleyball nets and balls. 
Thank The park is open from 8:00 am till sundown year-round.  In addition the park includes Whiskey Creek, an inlet which serves as a manatee sanctuary. Within the park is the Dania Beach Erojacks, a popular reef frequented by scuba divers.
On July 1, 2016, John U. Lloyd Beach State Park was renamed the Dr. Von D. Mizell-Eula Johnson State Park in honor of civil rights efforts undertaken by Mizell and Johnson during segregation.

References

External links

 Dr. Von D. Mizell-Eula Johnson State Park at Florida State Parks
 John U. Lloyd Beach State Recreation Area at Absolutely Florida
 John U. Lloyd Beach State Recreation Area at Wildernet

Parks in Broward County, Florida
State parks of Florida
Protected areas established in 1973
Hollywood, Florida
Beaches of Broward County, Florida
Beaches of Florida
1973 establishments in Florida
African-American history of Florida
History of racial segregation in the United States